The name Man-yi has been used to name four tropical cyclones in the western north Pacific Ocean. The name was contributed by Hong Kong and refers to High Island Reservoir (Man-yi Reservoir) in Sai Kung Peninsula, New Territories, Hong Kong, which was originally a strait that separated the peninsula to High Island.

 Typhoon Man-yi (2001) (T0109, 12W)
 Typhoon Man-yi (2007) (T0704, 04W, Bebeng) – struck Japan during July 2007.
 Typhoon Man-yi (2013) (T1318, 16W) – struck Japan during September 2013.
 Typhoon Man-yi (2018) (T1828, 34W, Tomas) – November typhoon that stayed out to sea.

Pacific typhoon set index articles